The Crowsnest Pass Timberwolves were a Junior 'A' ice hockey team in the Alberta Junior Hockey League.  Based out of the town of Blairmore, Alberta and playing at the Coleman Complex in Coleman, the team represented the Municipality of Crowsnest Pass.

The Timberwolves were founded in 1998 as an expansion team.  They lasted only six seasons in the Crowsnest Pass, however, before taking a leave of absence in 2004-05 before relocating to Okotoks to become the Okotoks Oilers.  The Timberwolves were the second team to represent the region, as The Pass Red Devils existed from 1972 to 1976.

Season-by-season record

Note: GP = Games played, W = Wins, L = Losses, T/OTL = Ties and overtime losses, SOL = Shootout losses Pts = Points, GF = Goals for, GA = Goals against

Playoffs
1999 DNQ
2000 DNQ
2001 Lost Quarter-final
Crowsnest Pass Timberwolves defeated Bow Valley Eagles 3-games-to-2
Olds Grizzlys defeated Crowsnest Pass Timberwolves 4-games-to-none
2002 Lost Preliminary
Camrose Kodiaks defeated Crowsnest Pass Timberwolves 3-games-to-none
2003 Lost Preliminary
Canmore Eagles defeated Crowsnest Pass Timberwolves 4-games-to-none
2004 Lost Preliminary
Calgary Canucks defeated Crowsnest Pass Timberwolves 3-games-to-1

NHL alumni
Jeremy Colliton
Rick Rypien
Devin Setoguchi

See also
 List of ice hockey teams in Alberta

References
Alberta Junior Hockey League website
AJHL Annual Guide & Record Book 2006-07

Defunct Alberta Junior Hockey League teams
Defunct ice hockey teams in Alberta
Defunct junior ice hockey teams in Canada
Ice hockey clubs established in 1998
1998 establishments in Alberta
2004 disestablishments in Alberta
Ice hockey clubs disestablished in 2004